The 1993/94 FIS Ski Flying World Cup was the 4th official World Cup season in ski flying awarded with small crystal globe as the subdiscipline of FIS Ski Jumping World Cup.

Calendar

Men

Standings 
Points were for the last time distributed by new scoring system.

Ski Flying

Nations Cup unofficial

References 

World cup
FIS Ski Flying World Cup